The 1985 Railway Cup Hurling Championship was the 59th staging of the Railway Cup since its establishment by the Gaelic Athletic Association in 1927. The cup began on 27 January 1985 and ended on 18 March 1985.

Munster were the defending champions.

On 18 March 1985, Munster won the cup after a 3-06 to 1-11 defeat of Connacht in the final at Semple Stadium. This was their 37th Railway Cup title overall and their second title in succession.

Results

Semi-finals

Final

Scoring statistics

Top scorers overall

Bibliography

 Donegan, Des, The Complete Handbook of Gaelic Games (DBA Publications Limited, 2005).

References

Railway Cup Hurling Championship
Railway Cup Hurling Championship
Hurling